Naudin may refer to:
 Charles Victor Naudin (1815–1899), a French botanist
 Christophe Naudin (born 1962), a French writer
 Emilio Naudin (1823–1890), an Italian operatic tenor
 Gustave Naudin, a French World War I flying ace

See also
 Sizaire-Naudin, a French automobile manufacturer based in Paris between 1905 and 1921